The North Fork Salmon River is a  tributary of the Salmon River, flowing through east-central Idaho in the United States.

See also
List of rivers of Idaho

References

Rivers of Idaho
Tributaries of the Salmon River (Idaho)
Rivers of Lemhi County, Idaho